Dom José Vieira Alvernaz (Riberinha, 5 February 1898 - Angra do Heroísmo, 13 March 1986) was a Portuguese prelate, Bishop of Cochin, Archbishop of Goa and Daman, Patriarch of the East Indies and one of the prominent figures of the Portuguese presence in India during the 20th century.

Biography 
He was ordained a priest in 1920.

In 1941, he was appointed Bishop of Cochin.

In 1950, he was appointed titular archbishop of Anasartha, co-adjunct archbishop of Goa and Daman and co-adjunct Patriarch of the East Indies. He succeeded Bishop José da Costa Nunes, in 1953, as Patriarch of the East Indies, a position he held until 1975. At that time, he retired and became archbishop emeritus of Goa.

After the Annexation of Portuguese Indian territories by the Indian Republic, in 1966, he fled the territory, and several suffragan dioceses were split (as occurred in 1953). Yet, Jose Vieira, was a moderator during the process of annexation that occurred in December 1961.

After his resignation, the Holy See put the Roman Catholic Archdiocese of Goa and Daman under his direct subordination.

Honours

On 18 April 2012, the Museum of Angra do Heroísmo, opened an exposition entitled D. José Vieira Alvernaz, Patriarca das Índias Orientais (D. José Vieira Alvernaz, Patriarch of the East Indies).

See also 
 Catholic Church in Portugal

References

External links 
 D. José Viera Alvernaz na Enciclopédia Açoriana
  GCatholic

Portuguese Roman Catholic archbishops
1898 births
1986 deaths
People from Pico Island
20th-century Roman Catholic archbishops in India
Patriarchs of the East Indies